Vanny or Vannie may refer to:

 Vannie Albanese (1912–1984), American football player
 Vannie Higgins (1897–1932), New York mobster and bootlegger during Prohibition
 Vanny Reis (born 1985), Cape Verdean beauty pageant winner
 Tep Vanny (born 1980), Cambodian land rights activist and human rights defender

See also
 André de Vanny (born 1984), Australian actor

Lists of people by nickname